= Chulaki =

Chulaki Chulaki
- Village
- Country: India
- State: Karnataka
- District: Belgaum

Population (2018)
  - Total: approx 5,000

Languages
  - Official: Kannada
- Time zone: UTC+5:30 (IST)
- Postal code: 561110

Chulaki is a village in Belgaum district in the southern state of Karnataka, India.
